Lightning Ridge is a small outback town in north-western New South Wales, Australia. The Lightning Ridge area is a centre of the mining of black opal and other opal gemstones.

Indigenous inhabitants
The traditional owners of the land around Lightning Ridge are the Yuwaalaraay people. Yuwaalayaay (also known as Yuwalyai, Euahlayi, Yuwaaliyaay, Gamilaraay, Kamilaroi, Yuwaaliyaayi) is an Australian Aboriginal language spoken on Yuwaalayaay country. It is closely related to the Gamilaraay and Yuwaalaraay languages. The Yuwaalayaay language region includes the landscape within the local government boundaries of the Shire of Balonne, including the town of Dirranbandi as well as the border town of Goodooga extending to Walgett and the Narran Lakes in New South Wales.

After they were displaced by the establishment of colonial pastoral stations, many Yuwaalaraay people stayed on as labourers, but were increasingly dispersed in the early 20th century. In 1936, several indigenous families living at a local government settlement were forced to move to the Brewarrina settlement.

European settlement
By the mid 1800s, British colonialists settled in the area, initially using the land for pastoral activities.

The name Lightning Ridge is said to have originated when in the 1870s, some passers-by found the bodies of a farmer, his dog, and 200 sheep, which had been struck by lightning.

Europeans did not discover the potential for opal mining in Lightning Ridge until the late 1800s. In 1905, the first shafts were dug, with the unique Black Opal soon attracting attention of fossickers in established mining towns such as White Cliffs. Charlie Nettleton, an early pioneer in the area, walked  from White Cliffs to see the Black Opal, walking back to White Cliffs the following year to develop a market and selling black opals to Ted Murphy, who later became the first resident opal buyer in Lightning Ridge. Nettleton, now regarded as the founder of the black opal industry, is commemorated with a life-sized bronze statue, the "Spirit of Lightning Ridge"; it is located in the town at 7 Morilla Street.

Population
At the 2001 census, the town had a population of 1,826, of whom 344 (18.8%) were Indigenous Australians. The population is said to be highly variable, as transient miners come and go over time. Prior to the 2004 public inquiry into the functioning of Walgett Shire, it worked on the basis that about 7,000 people were in the town, but the enquiry found that this estimate was not supported by the 2001 census and contrasted with the 1,109 people who voted in the town at the local government elections in 2004.  At the 2006 census, the population of Lightning Ridge had increased to 2,602 people.

By the 2016 census the population had fallen slightly to 2,284, with a median age of 51. 
 Aboriginal and Torres Strait Islander people made up 22.7% of the population. 
 About 69.2% of people were born in Australia, with other top countries of birth being England 1.9%, Germany 1.5%, and the Philippines 1.4%. 
 Around 79.1% of people only spoke English at home. 
 The most common responses for religion were no religion 29.3%, Anglican 22.1%, and Catholic 18.7%. Christianity was the largest religious group reported overall (62.9%).

The town was listed as one of the poorest places in the state according to the 2015 Dropping Off The Edge report.

Climate
Lightning Ridge has a hot semiarid climate (BSh) under the Köppen climate classification.

Activities
The Lightning Ridge Opal and Gem Festival takes place yearly. The town has a five-star Olympic pool, which features a diving complex, a rock climbing wall, and water theme park that operates during the summer holidays. Parts of the pool are protected by shade, and the complex has barbecue facilities. The Ella Nagy Youth Centre opened in 2000; it features a skatepark. Until 2011, Lightning Ridge hosted an annual goat race in the town's main street and a rodeo on the Easter long weekend. Goats were harnessed and driven by children, much like harness racing in equine sports. The goat races were accompanied by wheelie-bin races, and horse racing the following day.

Arts

Some artists have settled in and around Lightning Ridge. One of the most famous local Australian painters is John Murray, who brings the impressions of the Outback, often in a situation with man or fauna onto the canvas.

Fossils
Lightning Ridge is an important paleontological site, with fossils dating back to the Cretaceous period, 110 million years ago.  The sandstone rock once formed the bottom of a shallow inland sea, where the remains of aquatic plants and animals were preserved.  The site is especially important as a source of fossils of ancient mammals, which, at that time, were small creatures living in a world dominated by dinosaurs.  The fossils are sometimes opalised and discovered by opal miners.  Important discoveries at Lightning Ridge include the ancestral monotremes Kollikodon ritchiei and Steropodon galmani. In June 2019, a new species of dinosaur, Fostoria dhimbangunmal was described from fossils retrieved from Lightning Ridge. The plant-eating species lived at least 100 million years ago. It is the most complete dinosaur fossil to be found preserved as opal.

Fossicking
Since August 1992 when the Mining Act 1992 commenced, fossicking licences have not been required for fossicking in New South Wales.

Under the terms of this act, fossicking may now be carried out anywhere in the state providing these conditions are met:

No other act or law applies which would prevent it
The landholder's consent is obtained
The consent of any public or local authority having the management, control, or trusteeship of the land is obtained
The titleholder's consent is also obtained, where the location is covered by a current title under the Mining Act 1992 (This title may be an exploration licence, assessment lease, mining lease, mineral claim or Opal Prospecting Licence).

Water
Lightning Ridge has an abundance of hot water from a bore spring into the Great Artesian Basin and offers two hot-water pools for bathing. The public can tap mineral water at a hose in Harlequin Street. The Hot Artesian Bore Baths and Nettletons Shaft, on McDonald's Six Mile Opal Field, have been placed on the Register of the National Estate.

Notable residents
Australian comedian, actor and television presenter Paul Hogan claimed to be from Lightning Ridge to improve his chances to appear on Australian talent contest New Faces, but was actually born in Sydney. As the myth helped drive tourism to Lightning Ridge, Hogan has avoided correcting the record.

A legitimate native of Lightning Ridge is current Australia women's rugby union international Bella McKenzie.

Gallery

See also 
 Lightning Ridge Airport
 List of fossil sites (with link directory)

References

External links

 DPI Mineral Resources Lightning Ridge
 Plant Sites of Lightning Ridge
 Walgett Shire Council

Mining towns in New South Wales
Cretaceous paleontological sites of Australia
Paleontology in New South Wales
Walgett Shire